Peter Mičic (born 30 April 1986) is a retired Slovak football defender.

Career

Club
In July 2011, he joined Polish club KS Polkowice. He previously played for Slovak club FK Púchov and Czech club FK Dukla Prague.

References

External links
 
 Profile at fkdukla.cz 
 Profile at fotbal.idnes.cz 
 Profile at hmpsport.sk 

1986 births
Living people
Slovak footballers
Association football defenders
MŠK Púchov players
FK Dukla Prague players
Górnik Polkowice players
FC Nitra players
MFK Lokomotíva Zvolen players
Slovak Super Liga players
Slovak expatriate footballers
Expatriate footballers in Poland
Slovak expatriate sportspeople in Poland